Garry may refer to:

Names 
Gary (given name) or Garry
Garry (surname)

Places 
Cape Garry, South Shetlands
Fort Garry, Winnipeg, a district in Winnipeg, Manitoba, Canada
Garry Lake, Nunavut, Canada
Rural Municipality of Garry No. 245, Saskatchewan, Canada
Garry River, New Zealand
Loch Garry, Scotland
River Garry, Inverness-shire, Scotland
River Garry, Perthshire, Scotland

See also
Garry's Mod, a sandbox physics game
Garaidh
Garath (disambiguation)
Gareth (given name)
Garri (disambiguation)
Garrie (disambiguation)
Gary (disambiguation)
Ghari (disambiguation)